Lavie or Lavié or variant, may refer to:

People

Given name
Lavie Tidhar (born 1976), Israeli-born writer

Family name
 Colin LaVie (born 1962), Canadian politician
 Lisa Lavie, Canadian singer-songwriter
 Miguel Lavié (born 1986), Uruguayan soccer player
 Oren Lavie (born 1976), Israeli singer, songwriter, playwright and theatre director
 Peretz Lavie (born 1949), Israeli academic in the psychophysiology of sleep and sleep disorders
 Raffi Lavie (1937–2007), Israeli artist, art educator, and music and art critic
 Raúl Lavié (born 1936), Argentinian entertainer
 Ricardo Lavié (1923–2010), Argentinian actor
 Smadar Lavie (fl. 1991–2020), Israeli anthropologist and author
 Ted Lavie (born 1986), French football player
 Arik Lavie (1927–2004), Israeli pop-rock-folk singer and actor

Characters
Lavie Head, a character from the 2003 anime series Last Exile

Other uses
 Lavié, Lavié-Agoviépé, Togo
 Lavie (automobile), a former French automobile

See also

 
 Lavies, a surname
 Lavi (disambiguation)
 La vie (disambiguation)
 Vie (disambiguation)
 C'est la vie (disambiguation)
 Lavy, a surname

Levite surnames